Phasmomantis is a genus of mantis of the family Mantidae.

Species
There are two species recognized in the genus Phasmomantis:
Phasmomantis basalis (Stal, 1877)
Phasmomantis sumichrasti (Saussure, 1861)

See also
List of mantis genera and species

References

Stagmomantinae
Mantodea genera
Taxa named by Henri Louis Frédéric de Saussure